Don Cooper (born c. 1942) is an American curler.

Cooper won the United States men's curling championship in 1983, defeating Bud Somerville in the final.

Born in Edmonton, Cooper moved to Seattle at the age of 14 when his pharmacist father went into semi-retirement. He began curling at the age of 23. He moved to Colorado Springs in around 1980. At the time of the 1983 World Championships, he worked as a district manager at a computer company.

Teams

References

External links
 

Living people
American male curlers
American curling champions
1940s births
Curlers from Edmonton
Canadian emigrants to the United States
Sportspeople from Seattle
Sportspeople from Colorado Springs, Colorado